Gustavo Adolfo Espina Salguero (born 26 November 1946) was Vice President of Guatemala for President Jorge Serrano from 1991 to 1993, and President from June 1–5, 1993.

Presidency
Serrano attempted a self-coup on May 25, 1993, but was forced to flee into exile on June 1. Espina served as interim president for four days until June 5, when he was forced to resign by Congress after evidence surfaced that he was involved in the coup.  He spent the following years in exile, and in 1997 returned voluntarily to stand trial for his involvement in the coup.  He was convicted of violating the constitution, but his sentence was commuted to a small fine.

References

1946 births
Living people
People from Jutiapa Department
Presidents of Guatemala
Vice presidents of Guatemala
Guatemalan politicians convicted of crimes